Martin Naughton may refer to:

 Martin Naughton (businessman) (born 1940), Irish entrepreneur
 Martin Naughton (hurler) (born 1964), former Irish hurler